Van der Waerden's theorem is a theorem in the branch of mathematics called Ramsey theory.  Van der Waerden's theorem states that for any given positive integers r and k, there is some number N such that if the integers {1, 2, ..., N} are colored, each with one of r different colors, then there are at least k integers in arithmetic progression whose elements are of the same color. The least such N is the Van der Waerden number W(r, k), named after the Dutch mathematician B. L. van der Waerden.

Example
For example, when r = 2, you have two colors, say red and blue. W(2, 3) is bigger than 8, because you can color the integers from {1, ..., 8} like this:

and no three integers of the same color form an arithmetic progression.  But you can't add a ninth integer to the end without creating such a progression.  If you add a red 9, then the red 3, 6, and 9 are in arithmetic progression.  Alternatively, if you add a blue 9, then the blue 1, 5, and 9 are in arithmetic progression.

In fact, there is no way of coloring 1 through 9 without creating such a progression (it can be proved by considering examples).  Therefore, W(2, 3) is 9.

Open problem
It is an open problem to determine the values of W(r, k) for most values of r and k. The proof of the theorem provides only an upper bound.  For the case of r = 2 and k = 3, for example, the argument given below shows that it is sufficient to color the integers {1, ..., 325} with two colors to guarantee there will be a single-colored arithmetic progression of length 3. But in fact, the bound of 325 is very loose; the minimum required number of integers is only 9.  Any coloring of the integers {1, ..., 9} will have three evenly spaced integers of one color.

For r = 3 and k = 3, the bound given by the theorem is 7(2·37 + 1)(2·37·(2·37 + 1) + 1), or approximately 4.22·1014616. But actually, you don't need that many integers to guarantee a single-colored progression of length 3; you only need 27. (And it is possible to color {1, ..., 26} with three colors so that there is no single-colored arithmetic progression of length 3; for example:

An open problem is the attempt to reduce the general upper bound to any 'reasonable' function. Ronald Graham offered a prize of US$1000 for showing W(2, k) < 2k2. In addition, he offered a US$250 prize for a proof of his conjecture involving more general off-diagonal van der Waerden numbers, stating W(2; 3, k) ≤ kO(1), while mentioning numerical evidence suggests W(2; 3, k) = k2 + o(1). Ben Green disproved this latter conjecture and proved super-polynomial counterexamples to W(2; 3, k) < kr for any r. The best upper bound currently known is due to Timothy Gowers, who establishes

 

by first establishing a similar result for Szemerédi's theorem, which is a stronger version of Van der Waerden's theorem.  The previously best-known bound was due to Saharon Shelah and proceeded via first proving a result for the Hales–Jewett theorem, which is another strengthening of Van der Waerden's theorem.

Proof of Van der Waerden's theorem (in a special case) 

The following proof is due to Ron Graham and B.L. Rothschild. Khinchin gives a fairly simple proof of the theorem without estimating W(r, k).

Proof in the case of W(2, 3) 

We will prove the special case mentioned above, that W(2, 3) ≤ 325. Let c(n) be a coloring of the integers {1, ..., 325}.  We will find three elements of {1, ..., 325} in arithmetic progression that are the same color.

Divide {1, ..., 325} into the 65 blocks {1, ..., 5}, {6, ..., 10}, ... {321, ..., 325}, thus each block is of the form {5b + 1, ..., 5b + 5} for some b in {0, ..., 64}. Since each integer is colored either red or blue, each block is colored in one of 32 different ways.  By the pigeonhole principle, there are two blocks among the first 33 blocks that are colored identically. That is, there are two integers b1 and b2, both in {0,...,32}, such that

 c(5b1 + k) = c(5b2 + k)

for all k in {1, ..., 5}.  Among the three integers 5b1 + 1, 5b1 + 2, 5b1 + 3, there must be at least two that are of the same color. (The pigeonhole principle again.)  Call these 5b1 + a1 and 5b1 + a2, where the ai are in {1,2,3} and a1 < a2.  Suppose (without loss of generality) that these two integers are both red.  (If they are both blue, just exchange 'red' and 'blue' in what follows.)

Let a3 = 2a2 − a1. If 5b1 + a3 is red, then we have found our arithmetic progression: 5b1 + ai are all red.	

Otherwise, 5b1 + a3 is blue. Since a3 ≤ 5,  5b1 + a3 is in the b1 block, and since the b2 block is colored identically, 5b2 + a3 is also blue.

Now let b3 = 2b2 − b1. Then b3 ≤ 64. Consider the integer  5b3 + a3, which must be ≤ 325. What color is it?

If it is red, then 5b1 + a1, 5b2 + a2, and 5b3 + a3 form a red arithmetic progression. But if it is blue, then 5b1 + a3, 5b2 + a3, and 5b3 + a3 form a blue arithmetic progression. Either way, we are done.

Proof in the case of W(3, 3) 

A similar argument can be advanced to show that W(3, 3) ≤ 7(2·37+1)(2·37·(2·37+1)+1). One begins by dividing the integers into  2·37·(2·37 + 1) + 1 groups of 7(2·37 + 1) integers each; of the first 37·(2·37 + 1) + 1 groups, two must be colored identically.

Divide each of these two groups into 2·37+1 subgroups of 7 integers each; of the first 37 + 1 subgroups in each group, two of the subgroups must be colored identically.  Within each of these identical subgroups, two of the first four integers must be the same color, say red; this implies either a red progression or an element of a different color, say blue, in the same subgroup.

Since we have two identically-colored subgroups, there is a third subgroup, still in the same group that contains an element which, if either red or blue, would complete a red or blue progression, by a construction analogous to the one for W(2, 3). Suppose that this element is green. Since there is a group that is colored identically, it must contain copies of the red, blue, and green elements we have identified; we can now find a pair of red elements, a pair of blue elements, and a pair of green elements that 'focus' on the same integer, so that whatever color it is, it must complete a progression.

Proof in general case 
The proof for W(2, 3) depends essentially on proving that W(32, 2) ≤ 33.  We divide the integers {1,...,325} into 65 'blocks', each of which can be colored in 32 different ways, and then show that two blocks of the first 33 must be the same color, and there is a block colored the opposite way.  Similarly, the proof for W(3, 3) depends on proving that

 

By a double induction on the number of colors and the length of the progression, the theorem is proved in general.

Proof 

A D-dimensional arithmetic progression (AP) consists of
numbers of the form:
 
A -dimensional AP is homogeneous for some coloring when it is all the same color.

The boundaries of a -dimensional AP with benefits are these additional arithmetic progressions of dimension , down to 0. The 0-dimensional arithmetic progression is the single point at index value . A -dimensional AP with benefits is homogeneous when each of the boundaries are individually homogeneous, but different boundaries do not have to necessarily have the same color.

Next define the quantity  to be the least integer so that any assignment of  colors to an interval of length  or more necessarily contains a homogeneous -dimensional arithmetical progression with benefits.

Note that  is an upper bound for Van der Waerden's number. There are two inductions steps, as follows:

Base case: , i.e. if you want a length 1 homogeneous -dimensional arithmetic sequence, with or without benefits, you have nothing to do. So this forms the base of the induction. The Van der Waerden theorem itself is the assertion that  is finite, and it follows from the base case and the induction steps.

See also
 Van der Waerden numbers for all known values for W(n,r) and the best known bounds for unknown values.
Van der Waerden game – a game where the player picks integers from the set 1, 2, ..., N, and tries to collect an arithmetic progression of length n.
 Hales–Jewett theorem
 Rado's theorem
 Szemerédi's theorem
 Bartel Leendert van der Waerden

Notes

References
 (second edition originally published in Russian in 1948)

External links

Articles containing proofs
Ramsey theory
Theorems in discrete mathematics